Lieutenant General Willis Dale Crittenberger (December 2, 1890 – August 4, 1980) was a senior officer of the United States Army. He was a career soldier who served with distinction during the Italian campaign of World War II

Early life and military career

Crittenberger was born in Baltimore, Maryland on December 2, 1890. After growing up in Anderson, Indiana, he was appointed to the United States Military Academy (USMA) at West Point, New York in 1909, graduating four years later on June 12, 1913 with the West Point class of 1913, two years ahead of fellow cadet, friend and infantry officer, Dwight D. Eisenhower. Crittenberger was then commissioned as a second lieutenant in the Cavalry Branch of the United States Army and his first posting was with the 3rd Cavalry Regiment, then stationed at Fort Hood, Texas. Among his many classmates were Geoffrey Keyes, Henry Balding Lewis, Paul Newgarden, Richard U. Nicholas, Charles H. Corlett, William A. McCullogh, Douglass T. Greene, Robert M. Perkins, Louis A. Craig, Carlos Brewer, William R. Schmidt, Alexander Patch, Robert L. Spragins, Francis K. Newcomer, Henry B. Cheadle, Lunsford E. Oliver and William L. Roberts. Like Crittenberger, they were all destined to become general officers.

Between the wars
Unable to see service overseas in World War I, where he remained in the United States training recruits, Crittenberger's advanced military education included the United States Army Cavalry School at Fort Riley, Kansas in 1924, the United States Army Command and General Staff College at Fort Leavenworth, Kansas in 1925 and the United States Army War College at Washington Barracks in Washington, D.C. in 1930. After assignments to Fort Knox, Kentucky, the 1st Cavalry Regiment (Mechanized)'s new home in 1934, he served on staff positions to the Chief of Cavalry in Washington and, towards the end of the interwar period, realizing that the cavalry's role in any future conflict would be limited (as World War I and trench warfare had proved), becoming increasingly interested in armored warfare, and became chief of staff for the 1st Armored Division. On August 1, 1935 he was promoted to lieutenant colonel and, on June 17, 1941 to the temporary rank of colonel.

World War II
With the onset of the United States entry into World War II, Crittenberger, with the rank of brigadier general (having been promoted on July 10, 1941), was commanding the 2nd Armored Brigade of the 2nd Armored Division, under Major General George S. Patton. In February 1942, two months after the Japanese attack on Pearl Harbor on December 7, 1941 and the German declaration of war on the United States four days later, Crittenberger was promoted to the temporary rank of major general on February 16 and assumed command of the division while Patton was sent to command the I Armored Corps. His permanent rank was upgraded from lieutenant colonel to colonel on July 1, and, in August, after relinquishing command of the 2nd Armored Division to Major General Ernest N. Harmon, Crittenberger organized, trained and commanded the III Armored Corps, then composed of the 7th and 11th Armored Divisions, at Camp Polk, Louisiana. Redesignated as XIX Corps in October 1943, Crittenberger brought XIX Corps to England in January 1944.

In early 1944, General Dwight D. Eisenhower, the Supreme Allied Commander for the impending Allied invasion of Normandy, initially selected Crittenberger as one of three corps commanders for the invasion. The others were Major General Leonard T. Gerow, commanding V Corps, and Major General Roscoe B. Woodruff, commanding VII Corps. All three were well-known and trusted by General Eisenhower. However, Lieutenant General Omar Bradley, whom Eisenhower selected as the First Army commander for the D-Day invasion, replaced Eisenhower's picks, seeking differing temperaments and commanders that had more combat experience. At the same time, Lieutenant General Jacob L. Devers, Commanding General (CG) of the North African Theater of Operations, United States Army (NATOUSA), was seeking a corps commander for the U.S. Fifth Army's IV Corps for the Italian campaign and Crittenberger was chosen. Devers had in fact requested Crittenberger's services and thought highly of him, writing, "I consider Crittenberger to be one of my best commanders."

Crittenberger relinquished command of XIX Corps, briefly, to Major General Woodruff, who soon handed over to Major General Charles H. Corlett, a classmate from the West Point class of 1913, and departed England for the Mediterranean Theater of Operations (MTO), assuming command of IV Corps from Major General Alexander Patch, another West Point classmate, in Italy on March 20, 1944. Held in reserve during the early stages of the Italian campaign, IV Corps replaced the VI Corps, under Major General Lucian Truscott, in the front line after the liberation of the Italian capital of Rome in early June. Crittenberger's corps, coming under command of Lieutenant General Mark W. Clark's American Fifth Army (which, together with the British Eighth Army, formed part of the Allied Armies in Italy/AAI, later redesignated as the 15th Army Group, commanded by British General Sir Harold Alexander) later fought on through the Gothic Line, in some of the toughest and most difficult fighting of the Italian campaign.

Having the 1st Brazilian Infantry and the 6th South African Armoured Divisions in its ranks, in addition to the United States 1st Armored, the 92nd Infantry and the 10th Mountain Divisions, Crittenberger's IV Corps were in combat for over 390 days, 326 of them engaged in continuous combat. Crittenberger commanded IV Corps, still part of the Fifth Army, now commanded by Lieutenant General Lucian Truscott (like Crittenberger, a cavalryman whom Crittenberger had taught while he was an instructor at the U.S. Army Cavalry School), after Lieutenant General Clark was promoted to the command of 15th Army Group, as the western arm of the Allied thrust through northern Italy (codenamed Operation Grapeshot) to the Po River, capturing large numbers of German troops, and which ultimately ended with the surrender of the remaining German forces in Italy on May 2, 1945. The end of World War II in Europe came soon after, as did a promotion for Crittenberger to the temporary rank of lieutenant general on June 3, This was followed by the surrender of Japan on September 2, 1945, almost exactly six years since the war had begun.

During the campaign in Italy Crittenberger, who Eisenhower initially had doubts over, gained the respect of his superiors, such as Clark, Devers, and Truscott, the latter of whom wrote, "He [Crittenberger] has been outstanding during my entire time with the Fifth Army. He is in my opinion a better corps commander and a better battlefield leader than Geoff [[[Geoffrey Keyes]], a West Point classmate and the commander of II Corps throughout the campaign]."

Postwar career

In the postwar years Crittenberger, whose permanent rank was advanced from colonel to brigadier general on June 23, 1946, commanded the Caribbean Defense Command, including the Panama Canal Zone, then in 1947, became first commander-in-chief of United States Caribbean Command, a regional unified theater command and predecessor to today's United States Southern Command. January 24, 1948 saw his permanent rank promoted to major general. After a two-year stint as Commanding General of the First Army, at Fort Jay, Governors Island, New York, Crittenberger concluded his active duty military career in December 1952, leaving New York City with a ticker tape parade up Broadway.

Civilian career
In retirement, Crittenberger advised President Dwight D. Eisenhower on national security matters. Crittenberger served as president of the United States Military Academy Association of Graduates from 1955 to 1958 and president of the Greater New York Fund.

Crittenberger was Chairman of the Free Europe Committee for three years, from 1956 to 1959.

Family

Crittenberger married Josephine Frost Woodhull (1894–1978) on June 23, 1918. Two of his three sons served in the United States Armed Forces and died in combat. Corporal Townsend Woodhull Crittenberger (born May 13, 1925) was killed in action during the Rhine River crossing on March 25, 1945 during the final days of World War II, aged just 19. Colonel Dale Jackson Crittenberger (USMA 1950) (born May 27, 1927) commanding the 3rd Brigade of the 9th Infantry Division during the Vietnam War was killed in a mid-air collision on September 17, 1969 while directing combat operations, aged 42. Dale served as a White House military aide to President Eisenhower in 1959 and as a newly commissioned major received his new badge of rank from his father's old friend, the President.

A third son, Willis D. Crittenberger, Jr. (USMA 1942) also served in the United States Army in World War II with the 10th Armored Division, rising from lieutenant to lieutenant colonel during the war, retiring as a major general. He later was a spokesman for the Daughters of the American Revolution.

Lieutenant General Willis Dale Crittenberger died in Chevy Chase, Maryland on August 4, 1980 at the age of 89. He was buried at Arlington National Cemetery, Virginia with his wife and sons, Townsend and Dale.

Decorations

Books
 The final campaign across Italy; 1952 – His memoirs as commander of US Army IV Corps 
 Some thoughts on civil defense; 1954 4pgs Essay
 Debrief report; 1967 Dept. of the Army – Headquarters, II Field Force Vietnam Artillery 21pgs report

References

Further reading
 .
 .
 .
.

External links

Arlington National Cemetery page for Lt. Gen. Willis D. Crittenberger
Arlington National Cemetery page for Col. Dale J. Crittenberger
XIX Corps Website
Generals of World War II
United States Army Officers 1939–1945

|-

|-

|-

|-

1890 births
1980 deaths
United States Army Cavalry Branch personnel
Military personnel from Baltimore
United States Army personnel of World War I
United States Military Academy alumni
Burials at Arlington National Cemetery
United States Army Command and General Staff College alumni
Recipients of the Distinguished Service Medal (US Army)
Officiers of the Légion d'honneur
Recipients of the Croix de Guerre 1939–1945 (France)
United States Army generals of World War II
United States Army generals
United States Army War College alumni